Mahar Shwe Thein Daw Pagoda  (also known as Shwe Thein Daw) is a Buddhist temple in , about two miles north of Kyaukse, Mandalay Region, Myanmar. Mahar Shwe Thein Daw Buddha image is depicted in this temple, and has long been believed to grant the wishes of its worshippers. Students in near regions pray at this pagoda for blessings before their exams.

History

Mahar Shwe Thein Taw Pagoda was built by King Anawrahta of Pagan and Shin Arahan set the consecrate ground for the pagoda. The pagoda was originally named Shwe Thein Daw by Anawrahta, but the board of pagoda trustees renamed it to Mahar Shwe Thein Daw. The pagoda used to have an inscription, but the contents of the inscription are no longer known because the inscription was lost when Prime Minister U Nu was in power.

Although Mahar Shwe Thein Daw Pagoda has been worshiped for generations after Anawrahta, some historians say that the pagoda was covered with bushes about 100 years ago due to the negligence of the villagers. During that time an epidemic hit the village, and those who had fled the village cleared the bushes near the pagoda. Legend says that the clearing of the pagoda keeps the local village clear of epidemics.

References 

Buildings and structures in Mandalay Region

Buddhist temples in Myanmar
11th-century Buddhist temples
Buddhist pilgrimage sites in Myanmar